The 1999–2000 season of the Venezuelan Primera División, the top category of Venezuelan football, was played by 12 teams. The national champions were Deportivo Táchira.

Torneo Apertura

Torneo Clausura

Final stage

External links
Venezuela 2000 season at RSSSF

Venezuelan Primera División seasons
Ven
Ven
1999–2000 in Venezuelan football